Trey Ebanks (born 5 June 2000) is a Caymanian footballer who plays as a midfielder for Cayman Islands Premier League club Academy SC and the Cayman Islands national team.

Career
A former Caymanian youth international, Ebanks has represented Cayman Islands at 2018 CONCACAF U-20 Championship. He made his senior team debut on 16 October 2019 in a 1–0 CONCACAF Nations League win against Saint Martin. In February 2021, he was called up for World Cup qualifying matches against Suriname and Canada.

Career statistics

International

References

External links
 

2000 births
Living people
Association football midfielders
Caymanian footballers
Cayman Islands international footballers
Cayman Islands under-20 international footballers
Cayman Islands Premier League players